The Safe Schools Declaration is an inter-governmental political commitment that was opened for endorsement by countries at an international conference held in Oslo, Norway, on 28–29 May 2015. The Declaration provides countries the opportunity to express political support for the protection of students, teachers, and schools during times of armed conflict; the importance of the continuation of education during armed conflict; and the implementation of the Guidelines for Protecting Schools and Universities from Military Use during Armed Conflict.

As of March 2023, 117 states have endorsed the Safe Schools Declaration, which remains open for additional countries to join. The Ministry of Foreign Affairs of Norway is the depositary of endorsements.

On March 28–29, 2017, the ministries of foreign affairs and defense of Argentina co-hosted the Second International Safe Schools Conference in Buenos Aires.

In May 2017, the United Nations Secretary General, António Guterres, urged all Member States to endorse the Safe Schools Declaration.

On May 28–29, 2019, the Third International Safe Schools Conference was hosted in Palma De Mallorca, Spain.

On October 25-27, 2021, the Fourth International Conference on the Safe Schools Declaration was hosted in Abuja, Nigeria, and also virtually.

The Declaration has begun to influence countries' military policies for protecting schools from military use.

Drafting 
The Safe Schools Declaration was developed through consultations with states led by the ministries of foreign affairs of Norway and Argentina between January and May 2015. 

Representatives from more than 60 countries attended the conference launching the Safe Schools Declaration in 2015, along with the Norwegian Foreign Minister Børge Brende, Norwegian Defence Minister Ine Marie Eriksen Søreide, and Ziauddin Yousafzai the father of Nobel Peace Prize laureate Malala Yousafzai.

Representatives from more than 80 countries attended the second Safe Schools Conference in Buenos Aires in 2017.

Contents and Commitments 
"The impact of armed conflict on education presents urgent humanitarian, development and wider social challenges. Worldwide, schools and universities have been bombed, shelled and burned, and children, students, teachers and academics have been killed, maimed, abducted or arbitrarily detained. Educational facilities have been used by parties to armed conflict as, inter alia, bases, barracks or detention centres. Such actions expose students and education personnel to harm, deny large numbers of children and students their right to education and so deprive communities of the foundations on which to build their future. In many countries, armed conflict continues to destroy not just school infrastructure, but the hopes and ambitions of a whole generation of children." 
– Opening paragraph of Safe Schools Declaration

The Safe Schools Declaration describes the immediate and long-term consequences of attacks on students, teachers, schools, and universities, and the military use of schools and universities, during times of armed conflict. It contrasts this with the positive and protective role that education can have during armed conflict.

By joining the Declaration, states formally endorse the Guidelines for Protecting Schools and Universities from Military Use during Armed Conflict and commit to “bring them into domestic policy and operational frameworks as far as possible and appropriate.”

The Declaration also contains a number of other commitments aimed at strengthening the prevention of, and response to, attacks on education during armed conflict, including by: collecting reliable data on attacks and military use of schools and universities; providing assistance to victims of attacks; investigating allegations of violations of national and international law and prosecuting perpetrators where appropriate; developing and promoting “conflict sensitive” approaches to education; seeking to continue education during armed conflict; and supporting the work of the United Nations on the children and armed conflict agenda.

Lastly, the Declaration is a framework for collaboration and exchange, as endorsing states also agree to meet on a regular basis to review implementation of the Declaration and use of the Guidelines.

Endorsements 
As of March 2023, the following 117 countries have endorsed the Declaration:

Reactions 
The Secretary-General of the United Nations António Guterres has called upon all countries to endorse the Safe Schools Declaration.

Virginia Gamba, the Special Representative to the UN Secretary-General has said that all countries should endorse the Safe Schools Declaration, as "It has made an essential contribution towards promoting tangible measures to prevent attacks on education."

Former Prime Minister of the United Kingdom, Gordon Brown stated that "every country must now support" the Declaration.
The United Kingdom has not endorsed the Safe Schools Declaration.
In a letter from the Foreign and Commonwealth Office (02/03/16), James Dudddridge (then the Minister for Africa, the Overseas Territories, and the Caribbean) stated that:

“While we welcome the spirit of the Safe Schools Declaration, we are concerned that the accompanying Guidelines for Protecting Schools and Universities from Military use during Armed Conflict do not mirror the exact language of International Humanitarian Law, which risk complicating the application of International Humanitarian Law”.
This has been mirrored in a statement from a representative of the United Kingdom's Foreign and Commonwealth Office.

Leila Zerrougui, the former Special Representative to the Secretary-General of the United Nations said that she would "strongly advocate on behalf of children in conflict situations to persuade as many other Member States as we can to throw their support behind the initiative."
 
Jan Egeland, Secretary General of the Norwegian Refugee Council noted at the Safe Schools conference that "10 years from now we will look back on this day. Those who endorsed will say ‘we should really have done this earlier’. Those who did not endorse will say ‘why did we not endorse it?'"

References

See also
International Day to Protect Education from Attack

Education treaties
2015 documents